In Command is a live album by Canadian band Annihilator. Tracks 1-5 recorded live on November 11, 1989 at The Ritz, New York, NY. Tracks 6-14 recorded live on November 2, 1990 at The Showroom, San Antonio, TX.

Track listing

Personnel
 Jeff Waters - lead and rhythm guitar, vocals
 Randy Rampage - vocals (tracks 1-5)
 Coburn Pharr - vocals (tracks 6-14)
 Dave Scott Davis - guitar, solo on track The Fun Palace
 Wayne Darley - bass
 Ray Hartmann - drums

Annihilator (band) albums
1996 live albums
Live thrash metal albums